Diocese of Vellore may refer to:

 Diocese of Vellore of the Church of South India
 Roman Catholic Diocese of Vellore